The first season of Beauty & the Beast, an American television series developed by Sherri Cooper-Landsman and Jennifer Levin and very loosely inspired by the 1987 CBS television series of the same name, commenced airing in the United States on October 11, 2012, concluded May 16, 2013, and consisted of 22 episodes.

Beauty & the Beast's first season aired in the United States (U.S.) on Thursdays at 9:00 pm ET on The CW, a terrestrial television network, where it received an average of 1.78 million viewers per episode.

Premise
Catherine Chandler, a law student, witnesses her mother being shot the same night she is saved from her mother's murderers by a supposed beast. Nine years later, and now working as a detective for the NYPD, a case leads her to discover that Vincent Keller, an ex-soldier believed to have been killed in action during military service, is actually alive. As Catherine gets to know him, she starts finding out more about her mother's murder and about who (and what) Vincent really is. At the same time, they get to know one another and eventually fall in love.

Plot
This season revolves around Catherine and Vincent trying to pursue a relationship together, whilst being hunted down by a top-secret government organization named Muirfield who want Vincent dead. Muirfield are revealed to have conducted a high-profile secret experiment on soldiers fighting in Afghanistan. These experiments resulted in every soldier becoming physically stronger and faster, hoping this would win the war quicker. But, something went wrong, as the entire force went out of control with their new abilities. The government gave orders to kill them all, but Vincent escaped and has been in hiding ever since. Muirfield make several attempts to capture Vincent during this season, and even enlist the help of Cat and those close to her to capture him.

Catherine's family history is delved into in this first season, as her mother's unsolved murder has preyed on her mind for nine years. Catherine witnessed her mother shot and killed by two hitmen who were then killed by Vincent. Catherine refused to believe the official police report that her mother's death was that of carjacking gone wrong since the men who killed her mother suddenly appeared and began shooting without saying a word, as well as that the two dead killers identities were never found in any police record, leading Catherine to believe that her mother's killing was that of a government conspiracy. It was later revealed that Catherine's mother worked for Muirfield, conducting the experiments, and ultimately helped turn Vincent into a beast. Catherine must deal with conflicted feelings of her mother's memory across this season, having been determined to solve her case for all this time. When Catherine watches her father get run over in the season finale, she then learns that, biologically, he was not her real father after all.

Vincent's DNA mutates as the season progresses, as he becomes more beast-like. He begins experiencing black-outs, which J.T. associates with Catherine's interference. Cat and Vincent will stop at nothing to see each other, however. Assistant District Attorney Gabriel Lowen visits Cat's precinct to investigate the beast-like attack in the city and over time he reveals that not only does he know about Muirfield but that he shares the same ability as Vincent. At first an enemy, Gabriel goes on to become an ally to Vincent by the end of the first season and suggests he has found a cure to the virus inflicted on them by Muirfield. Vincent ultimately wonders if he wants to be cured or not.

Vincent is captured in the season finale as a helicopter drops a net on him and flies him away, leaving Catherine heartbroken. With Vincent captured, a gun is then aimed at Catherine's head. But, someone orders them not to shoot; Agent Bob Reynolds –Catherine's biological father.

Cast

Main
Kristin Kreuk as Catherine "Cat" Chandler
Jay Ryan as Vincent Keller
Max Brown as Evan Marks
Sendhil Ramamurthy as Gabriel Lowan
Austin Basis as J.T. Forbes
Nina Lisandrello as Tess Vargas
Brian White as Joe Bishop

Recurring
Nicole Gale Anderson as Heather Chandler
Rob Stewart as Thomas Chandler
Bridget Regan as Alex Salter
Shantel VanSanten as Tyler
Edi Gathegi as Kyle
Khaira Ledeyo as Dr. Vanessa Chandler
Ty Olsson as Garnett
Rachel Skarsten as Brooke Chandler
Christian Keyes as Darius Bishop
Ted Whittall as Agent Bob Reynolds

Notes

Episodes

Reception
The first season was given a 33 out of 100 score on Metacritic, indicating "generally unfavorable" reviews from 19 critics.

Ratings

DVD release

References

Season
2012 American television seasons
2013 American television seasons